Les Planes d'Hostoles is a village and municipality in the province of Girona and autonomous community of Catalonia, Spain.

From 1900, Les Planes d'Hostoles was linked to Girona by the narrow gauge Olot–Girona railway, which was extended to Sant Feliu de Pallerols in 1902 and Olot in 1911. The line closed in 1969 and has since been converted into a greenway.

Notable residents
 Francesc Arnau (1975–2021), footballer
 Carla Simón (1986-), filmmaker

References

External links
 Government data pages 

Municipalities in Garrotxa